The year 1971 was the year when Bangladesh achieved independence and emerged as a sovereign country.

Incumbents

 President: Sheikh Mujibur Rahman (starting 17 April)
 Prime Minister: Tajuddin Ahmad (starting 17 April)

Events

March
 2 March – First hoisting of the National flag of Bangladesh (initial version) at the Dhaka University by Vice President of Dhaka University Students' Union (DUCSU) leader A. S. M. Abdur Rab.
 7 March – Sheikh Mujibur Rahman makes his historic freedom speech.
 25 March – Pakistan Army launches Operation Searchlight at midnight on the 25th, marking the start of the 1971 Bangladesh atrocities. Sheikh Mujib is arrested. (to 26 March)
 26 March – Sheikh Mujib declares the independence of Bangladesh before his arrest by Pakistani Army.
 27 March – Major Ziaur Rahman broadcasts the declaration of independence on behalf of Bangabandhu  Sheikh Mujibur Rahman over the radio.
 31 March – Kushtia resistance begins.

April
 2 April – Jinjira genocide
 10 April – Formation of a provisional Bangladesh government-in-exile.
 12 April – M. A. G. Osmani takes command of the Bangladesh Armed Forces.
 17 April – The government-in-exile takes oath at Mujibnagar.
 18 April – Battle of Daruin, Comilla and Battle of Rangamati-Mahalchari waterway, Chittagong Hill Tracts.

May
 5 May – Gopalpur massacre, workers slain by the Pakistani Army
 20 May – Chuknagar massacre by the Pakistan Army.
 24 May – Swadhin Bangla Betar Kendra radio station established in Kolkata.

July
 11 July – Sector Commanders Conference 1971. (to 17 July)

August
 16 August – Operation Jackpot, Bangladesh naval commando operation.
 20 August – Flight Lieutenant Matiur Rahman attempts to defect after hijacking a fighter plane.

September
 5 September – Battle of Goahati, Jessore.
 28 September – Bangladesh Air Force functional.

October
 13 October – Dhaka guerrillas kill Abdul Monem Khan, governor of East Pakistan.
 28 October – Battle of Dhalai Outpost, Srimongol.

November
 9 November – Six small ships constitute the first fleet of Bangladesh Navy.
 16 November – Battle of Ajmiriganj, an 18‑hour encounter between MB Freedom Fighters and the Pakistan army.
 20 November – Battle of Garibpur between India and the Pakistan Army. (to 21 November)
 21 November – Mitro Bahini, a joint force of Bangladesh and Indian troops formed.
 22 November – Battle of Boyra, involving Pakistani and Indian air force.

December

 3 December – Indo-Pakistani War of 1971 breaks out. Bangladesh Air Force destroys Pakistani oil depots.
 4 December – India officially invades East Pakistan.
 6 December – India becomes the first country to recognize Bangladesh. Swadhin Bangla Betar Kendra radio station becomes Bangladesh Betar.
 7 December – Liberation of Jessore, Sylhet and the Moulovi Bazar.
 9 December – Chandpur and Daudkandi liberated.
 10 December – Liberation of Laksham. Two Bangladeshi ships sunk mistakenly by Indian air attack.
 11 December – Liberation of Hilli, Mymensingh, Kushtia and Noakhali.
 14 December – Selective genocide of nationalist intellectuals, liberation of Bogra.
 16 December – Surrender of the Pakistan army and liberation of Dhaka.
 22 December – The provisional government of Bangladesh arrives in Dhaka from exile.

Sports

The Shadhin Bangla Football Team was formed by Bangladesh Krira Samity of the Bangladeshi government in exile shortly after the start of liberation war in 1971. This is the first instance of a Bangladesh national football team in any form. The team toured throughout India playing a total of 16 friendly matches to raise international awareness and economic support for the liberation war.

The Shadhin Bangla football team captain Zakaria Pintoo, was the first person to hoist the Bangladesh flag outside the territorial Bangladesh. By the end of the 16th match the team had contributed Tk 5 lac to Muktijuddho Fund in 1971.

Climate

Births
9 February - Khan Asifur Rahman Agun, musician.
23 March – Bipasha Hayat, actor and painter
19 September - Salman Shah, actor.

Deaths

War Heroes
8 April - Bir Sreshtho Munshi Abdur Rouf, war hero (b. 1943)
18 April - Bir Sreshtho Mostafa Kamal, war hero (b. 1948)
20 August - Bir Sreshtho Matiur Rahman, war hero (b. 1930s)
28 October - Bir Sreshtho Hamidur Rahman, war hero (b. 1953)
5 September - Bir Sreshtho Nur Mohammad Sheikh, war hero (b. 1936)
10 December - Bir Sreshtho Mohammad Ruhul Amin, war hero (b. 1935)
14 December - Bir Sreshtho Mohiuddin Jahangir, war hero (b. 1949)

Martyred Intellectuals
25 March - Dr. AKM Asadul Haq, physician (b. 1928)
25 March - ANM Muniruzzaman, statistician (b. 1942)
25 March - Ataur Rahman Khan Khadim, physicist (b. 1933)
25 March - Dr. Fazlur Rahman Khan, geologist (b. 1939)
25 March - Dr. Govinda Chandra Dev, educationist (b. 1907)
25 March - Dr. Abdul Muktadir, geologist (b. 1940)
25 March - Nazmul Hoque Sarkar, lawyer, politician (b. 1937)
25 March - Sultanuddin Ahmed, engineer (b. 1935)
26 March - Mohammad Aminuddin, lawyer (b. 1921)
27 March - Meherun Nesa, poet (b. 1942)
29 March - Dhirendranath Datta, politician, lawyer (b. 1886)
29 March - Khondakar Abu Taleb, journalist (b. 1921)
30 March - Dr. Jyotirmoy Guhathakurta, educationist (b. 1920)
31 March - Shahid Saber, journalist (b. 1930)
April - Muhammad Shafi, dentist (b. 1915)
8 April - Mohammad Shamshad Ali, physician (b. 1934)
9 April - Dr. Shamsuddin Ahmed, physician (b. 1920)
12 April - Dr. Jekrul Haque physician, politician (b. 1914)
14 April - Dr. Abul Fazal Ziaur Rahman, physician (b. 1926)
14 April - Sukharanjan Samaddar, educationist (b. 1938)
15 April - Muhammad Habibar Rahman, mathematician (b. 1940)
24 April - Dr. Suleman Khan, physician (b. 1939)
26 April - Dr. Mohammad Sadat Ali, educationist (b. 1942)
5 May - M Anwarul Azim, industrial administrator (b. 1931)
7 May - Ranadaprasad Saha, philanthropist (b. 1896)
13 May - Sheikh Abdus Salam, educationist (b. 1940)
29 May - Dr. Kosiruddin Talukder, physician (b. 1899)
28 August - Saroj Kumar Nath Adhikari, educationist (b. 1938)
30 August - Altaf Mahmud, lyricist and musician (b. 1933)
9 September - Khondakar Abul Kashem, educationist (b. 1944)
26 September - Dr. Atiqur Rahman, physician (b. 1931)
28 October - Mohammad Moazzem Hossain, educationist (b. 1952)
15 November - Dr. Azharul Haque, physician (b. 1940)
20 November - Dr. ABM Nurul Alam, physician (b. 1961)
25 November - Mir Abdul Qayyum, psychologist (b. 1939)
December - Dr. Anwar Pasha, author (b. 1928)
11 December - ANM Golam Mostafa, journalist (b. 1942)
12 December - Nizamuddin Ahmed, journalist (b. 1929)
14 December - Dr. Faizul Mahi, educationist (b. 1939)
14 December - Dr. Ghyasuddin Ahmed, educationist (b. 1935)
14 December - Munier Chowdhury, educationist, author (b. 1925)
14 December - Dr. Mufazzal Haider Chaudhury, educationist, linguist (b. 1926)
14 December - Dr. M Abul Khair, educationist (b. 1929)
14 December - Dr. Mohammad Mortaza, physician (b. 1931)
14 December - Dr. Rashidul Hasan, educationist (b. 1932)
14 December - Dr. Sirajul Haque Khan, educationist (b. 1924)
14 December - Dr. Santosh Chandra Bhattacharyya, educationist (b. 1915)
14 December - Shahidullah Kaiser, journalist, author (b. 1927)
14 December - Selina Parvin, journalist, poet (b. 1931)
15 December - Dr. AFM Alim Chowdhury, ophthalmologist (b 1928)
15 December - Dr. Mohammed Fazle Rabbee, cardiologist (b. 1932)
16 December - Dr. Ayesha Bedora Choudhury, physician (b. 1935)

See also 
List of Bangladeshi films of 1971
Timeline of Bangladeshi history

References